Modern Philology is a literary journal that was established in 1903. It publishes scholarly articles on literature, literary scholarship, history, and criticism in all modern world languages and book reviews of recent books as well as review articles and research on archival documents. It is published by the University of Chicago Press.

References

External links 
 
 PDFs of volumes 1-18 available from Internet Archive

University of Chicago Press academic journals
Publications established in 1903
Quarterly journals
Literary magazines published in the United States
English-language journals